Nyctemera latistriga is a moth of the family Erebidae first described by Francis Walker in 1854. It is found from the Oriental tropics of India, Sri Lanka, Myanmar, Andaman Islands, Sumatra, Borneo to the Philippines and Lombok.

Description
Adults are day flying. Differs from Nyctemera lacticinia in having the broad white streak on base of inner margin of forewing replaced by narrow streaks on costa, vein 1, and innermargin and by a very broad streak below he median nervure. The postmedial band of spots with the upper two conjoined. The fourth is very large and fifth absent.

References

 

Nyctemerina
Moths described in 1854